Gerard Debaets (17 April 1898 – 27 April 1959) was a Belgian racing cyclist. He won the Tour of Flanders in 1924 and 1927 and the Belgian national road race title in 1925. He also specialized in track cycling, winning a total of 18 six-day events, including six times the most prestigious Six Days of New York. Debaets was a resident of Fair Lawn and North Haledon, New Jersey, where he died in 1959 of a heart attack.

References

External links

1898 births
1959 deaths
Belgian male cyclists
People from Fair Lawn, New Jersey
People from North Haledon, New Jersey
Belgian track cyclists
Sportspeople from Kortrijk
Cyclists from West Flanders